University is a Tyne and Wear Metro station, serving the University of Sunderland and suburb of Ashbrooke, City of Sunderland in Tyne and Wear. It joined the network on 31 March 2002, following the opening of the extension from Pelaw to South Hylton.

History
The station is located on the alignment of the former Penshaw branch of the York, Newcastle and Berwick Railway, the line having closed to passengers in May 1964, following the Beeching Axe.

The University of Sunderland is also served by the station at St. Peter's – this being the nearest to The Sir Tom Cowie Campus at St. Peter's.

Along with other stations on the line between Fellgate and South Hylton, the station is fitted with vitreous enamel panels designed by artist, Morag Morrison. Each station uses a different arrangement of colours, with strong colours used in platform shelters and ticketing areas, and a more neutral palate for external elements.

Facilities 
Step-free access is available at all stations across the Tyne and Wear Metro network, with ramped access to both platforms at University. The station is equipped with ticket machines, waiting shelter, seating, next train information displays, timetable posters, and an emergency help point on both platforms. Ticket machines are able to accept payment with credit and debit card (including contactless payment), notes and coins. The station is also fitted with smartcard validators, which feature at all stations across the network.

There is no dedicated car parking available at the station. There is the provision for cycle parking, with six cycle pods available for use.

Services 
, the station is served by up to five trains per hour on weekdays and Saturday, and up to four trains per hour during the evening and on Sunday.

Rolling stock used: Class 599 Metrocar

References

External links

Timetable and station information for University

Sunderland
University of Sunderland
2002 establishments in England
Railway stations in Great Britain opened in 2002
Tyne and Wear Metro Green line stations
Transport in the City of Sunderland
Transport in Tyne and Wear
Railway stations at university and college campuses
